Success for All (SFA) are standards-based Comprehensive School Reform curricula for early childhood through middle school, produced by the nonprofit organization Success for All Foundation (SFAF) of Baltimore, Maryland, USA. Psychologist Robert Slavin of Johns Hopkins University founded SFAF along with his wife and research collaborator, Nancy Madden. The SFA and its evidence-based school improvement strategy continue to help improve literacy levels and general education in the US, particularly for children in disadvantaged circumstances.

In 2010, Success for All received a nearly $50 million grant from the U.S. Department of Education.

Improvement strategy 
Elements of the SFA school system include: structured teaching of reading (an early leader in phonics teaching); social and emotional development; cooperative learning and oracy; teaching at the right level and providing catch up tutoring for children who are behind.

Tutoring with the Lightning Squad is the SFA tutoring programme. The tutoring is a blended approach with in-person tutoring supported by an online tutoring platform. Tutoring activities are designed to improve reading skills, fluency, comprehension, spelling and phonics.

International 
With support from the Fischer Family Trust, SFA UK was established in 1999 to adapt its content in UK schools. SFA has supported over 100 primary schools in the UK with a whole school improvement approach centred on sustainable improvements in teaching and learning literacy whilst developing the effective use of data. In 2019 the SFA school Applegarth was ranked 6th best school in the UK by the Times newspaper.

Tutoring with the Lightning Squad has been made into a UK version in collaboration with SFA UK and FFT education. In 2021 it will be used by 14,000 students to help catch up reading after COVID-19 lockdowns as part of the National Tutoring Programme.

Criticism
The Success for All program was critiqued in Jonathan Kozol's book The Shame of the Nation as excessively dogmatic, utilitarian, and authoritarian.
The Success for All program was also criticized in Kenneth Saltman's book The Edison Schools for undermining teacher autonomy, misrepresenting history and culture, and promoting a politicized conservative curriculum agenda under the guise of disinterested objectivity.

See also 

 Robert Slavin
 Mike Fischer

References

Slavin, R.E., Madden, N.A., Dolan, L.J., Wasik, B.A., Ross, S., Smith, L., & Dianda, M. (1996). Success for All: A summary of research. Journal of Education for Students Placed At Risk, 1(1), 41–76. 
"Success for All: Unified curriculum drives Ohio district", Barbara Kantrowitz, MSNBC, September 23, 2012
Video: Poorest children among highest performers at Ohio school, MSNBC, aired September 24, 2012

External links
Success for All Foundation
Consumer Guide: Success for All, August 1993, Office of Research, Office of Educational Research and Improvement (OERI), U.S. Department of Education
Success for All Foundation UK
Tutoring with the Lightning Squad

Learning to read
Reading (process)
Standards-based education
Phonics curricula
Basal readers
United States Department of Education